Florian Faure (born 26 March 1983) is a French rugby union player. His position is Flanker and he currently plays for FC Grenoble in the Top 14.

Career
He began his career with FC Grenoble, moving to Castres in 2005 after Grenoble were relegated at the end of the 2004–05 Top 16 season. He spent four seasons with Castres before moving to Biarritz in 2010. He returned to FC Grenoble in 2012 after their promotion to the Top 14.

References

1983 births
Living people
French rugby union players
FC Grenoble players
Castres Olympique players
Biarritz Olympique players
Rugby union flankers